Le Révélateur is a 1968 experimental narrative film by Philippe Garrel.

Synopsis
The film follows a 4-year-old boy (Stanislas Robiolles) and his parents (Laurent Terzieff and Bernadette Lafont).
Cinematographer Michel Fournier, a then-frequent collaborator of Garrel, considers this their best work together.

Cast 
 Stanislas Robiolles as The Child 
 Laurent Terzieff as The Father 
 Bernadette Lafont as The Mother

Production
Le Révélateur was photographed in Munich. The film is intentionally silent, and it is rumored that it is intended to be projected at 18 frames per second, the traditional speed for silent films. 
Michel Fournier worked as the cinematographer on the film.

References

External links 
 

1968 films
French black-and-white films
Films directed by Philippe Garrel
French silent feature films
1960s French films